Heteroxyidae is a family of sponges belonging to the order Axinellida.

Genera:
 Acanthoclada Bergquist, 1970
 Alloscleria Topsent, 1927
 Alveospongia Santos, Pinheiro, Hajdu & Van Soest, 2016
 Desmoxya
 Didiscus Dendy, 1922
 Heteroxya Topsent, 1898
 Julavis Laubenfels, 1936
 Myrmekioderma Ehlers, 1870
 Negombo Dendy, 1905
 Parahigginsia Dendy, 1924

References

Sponges